is a former Japanese football player.

Playing career
Minamoto was born in Hiroshima on 2 July 1972. After graduating from high school, he joined Yanmar Diesel (later Cerezo Osaka) in 1991. He played many matches as defensive midfielder from 1991. The club won the champions in 1994 and was promoted to J1 League from 1995. Although he played as regular player, he was released end of 1997 season. In 1998, he moved to his local club Sanfrecce Hiroshima. He retired end of 1998 season.

Club statistics

References

External links

biglobe.ne.jp

1972 births
Living people
Association football people from Hiroshima Prefecture
Japanese footballers
Japan Soccer League players
J1 League players
Japan Football League (1992–1998) players
Cerezo Osaka players
Sanfrecce Hiroshima players
Association football midfielders